Danielle Monique Conway (born April 26, 1968) is an American lawyer and academic. She has served as the Dean of Penn State Dickinson Law since 2019 and is an expert in government procurement law and intellectual property law. Her scholarship is focused on advancing the public interest through insights into technology and innovation and their impact on modern society. She is an advocate of "social entrepreneurism," with an emphasis on empowering Indigenous Peoples and minority groups to effectively and creatively use business, innovation, and intellectual property rights and protections to build capacity within those communities. Prior to her appointment at Penn State Dickinson Law, she served as the Dean of University of Maine School of Law She was also previously the Michael J. Marks Distinguished Professor of Business Law at the William S. Richardson School of Law at University of Hawaiʻi at Mānoa, where she served as Director of the Hawaii Procurement Institute. Conway retired from the U.S. Army in 2016 with the rank of lieutenant colonel after 27 years of combined active, reserve, and national guard service.

Background
Born in Pennsylvania, Conway is an African-American. She graduated with a B.S. in International Business and Finance from New York University in New York City in 1989, later earning a Juris Doctor, cum laude, from Howard University School of Law in Washington, D.C. in 1992 and a Dual LLM from George Washington University Law School in Washington, D.C. in 1996, in Government Procurement Law and Environmental Law.

Scholarship
Among other writings, Conway is the author and coauthor of several books:

Survey of United States Government Contracts Law: Policy, Principles, and Practice 
State and Local Government Procurement 
Intellectual Property in Government Transactions
Transnational Intellectual Property Law 
Intellectual Property, Software, and Information Licensing: Law and Practice 
Licensing Intellectual Property: Theory and Application
Intellectual Property, Entrepreneurship and Social Justice: From Swords to Ploughshares

References

1968 births
Living people
20th-century African-American people
20th-century African-American women
21st-century African-American people
21st-century African-American women
Academics from Pennsylvania
African-American women lawyers
American women lawyers
African-American lawyers
African-American academics
American women academics
Deans of law schools in the United States
African-American women academics
Female United States Army officers
Howard University School of Law alumni
New York University alumni
Maine National Guard personnel
United States Army Judge Advocate General's Corps
University of Maine School of Law faculty
William S. Richardson School of Law faculty
Women deans (academic)
American women legal scholars
American legal scholars